The Strange World of Planet X (a.k.a.  Cosmic Monsters in the United States) is an independently made 1958 British science fiction horror film, produced by George Maynard and John Bash, directed by Gilbert Gunn, that stars Forrest Tucker and Gaby André. The film was distributed in the UK in February, 1958 by Eros Films. It was released in the US on July 7, 1958 by Distributors Corporation of America as a double feature with The Crawling Eye, also starring Tucker.

A monomaniacal scientist creates ultra-sensitive, disruptive magnetic fields, which have unexpected side effects, while also attracting unidentified flying objects from outer space. Strange things begin to happen, including a freak storm, blasts of cosmic radiation that penetrates the Earth's normally protective magnetic shield, and insects and spiders mutating into giant flesh-eating monsters.

The film, meant as a cautionary tale about science, was adapted by Paul Ryder and Joe Ambor from the 1957 Rene Ray novel of the same name; a made-for-TV serial, adapted by Rene Ray in 1956, had aired previously in the UK and was the basis for the feature film.

Plot
In the south of England, at an isolated laboratory near a small village, physicist Dr. Laird (Alec Mango) is assisted by American scientist Gilbert Graham (Forrest Tucker). They are performing a series of advanced and dangerous experiments with magnetic fields, while using massive amounts of power in equipment never designed to carry such loads. An accident occurs and injures another assistant, after which a request for a replacement sent to the Ministry of Defence brings Brigadier Cartwright (Wyndham Goldie) down to investigate. He is accompanied by a woman computer expert, Michele Dupont (Gaby Andre), who helps to solve Laird's power problem, but not the larger risks inherent in his experiments.

Cartwright is impressed when an interrupted experiment transforms several pieces of steel, not in the test chamber, into useless lumps of powder. His report convinces the Deputy Defence Minister Gerald Wilson (Geoffrey Chater) to make Laird's project a top priority. He sends down a full security team, led by counter-espionage expert Jimmy Murray (Hugh Latimer). It soon becomes clear, however, that enemy agents are the least of the dangers around Laird's project: The hyper-magnetic fields that he has generated have been affecting the ionosphere, causing unnatural weather patterns, threatening ships at sea hundreds of miles away, and also weakening the magnetic shield that protects the surface of the Earth from cosmic rays. A sudden burst of cosmic radiation from deep space causes brain damage in one local man, turning him into a homicidal maniac, while also causing the insect life to mutate in the area around the village and laboratory.

In the midst of this growing threat to the world's safety, a mysterious "Mr. Smith" (Martin Benson) arrives in the village. He is well-spoken, with little knowledge of ordinary life, but a great deal of knowledge about magnetic fields, while offering strong opinions about the dangerous experiments that Dr. Laird is conducting. Murray is positive that he is a spy, but Graham and Dupont decide that there is less threat from him than from the obstinate Dr. Laird, who plans on continuing his risky work. Even with "Mr. Smith"s dire warnings, the forest adjacent to the village is soon swarming with gigantic insects and other mutated monsters. Graham's and Dupont's best efforts fail to stop Dr. Laird, and so they alert the authorities to investigate and send in the military. Later, when leaving the laboratory, Dupont is threatened by the encroaching monsters and becomes trapped in the web of a giant spider. The army arrives in time and is able to destroy all the mutations, saving her life.

"Mr. Smith" reveals to Graham that he is an alien from another world (withholding its name). Later, Graham explains to Dupont, Murray, and Cartwright that "Mr. Smith" is actually an alien emissary from a "Planet X", while also informing them that Laird has gone mad and plans to continue his dangerous experiments. "Mr. Smith" explains that his mission is to warn humanity of the likelihood that Earth's orbit will be destabilized if the magnetic experiments will continue. They are already a threat to "Planet X", having caused the crash on Earth of one of their flying saucers. "Mr. Smith" is asked to help stop Dr. Laird, but being an emissary, he is at first reluctant. However, now faced with a continued threat, he agrees. They quickly leave and go back to stop Dr. Laird, who has already started up his equipment. "Mr. Smith" in the meantime has summoned his flying saucer using a hand-held device, positioning it directly above the laboratory. It fires down multiple rays that obliterate the building. With the coming disaster averted, the alien says his goodbyes to Graham and Dupont and walks to the landed saucer. It quickly becomes just an oval of light ascending into the night sky.

Cast
 Forrest Tucker as Gil Graham
 Gaby André as Michele Dupont
 Martin Benson as Smith
 Alec Mango as Dr. Laird
 Wyndham Goldie as Brigadier Cartwright
 Hugh Latimer as Jimmy Murray
 Dandy Nichols as Mrs. Tucker
 Richard Warner as Inspector Burns
 Patricia Sinclair as Helen Forsyth
 Geoffrey Chater as Gerard Wilson
 Hilda Fenemore as Mrs. Hale

Release and reception
In his January 1, 1959 review in The New York Times, film critic Richard W. Nason did not mention the double feature's top-billed player, Forrest Tucker, and opined that "..."The Crawling Eye" and "The Cosmic Monster" do nothing to enhance or advance the copious genre of science fiction."

On its original theatrical release, it was notably unsuccessful at the box office; it became something of a cult film due to later television syndication. In the United States the film was distributed by Distributors Corporation of America who had a deal with a series of drive-in movie theaters and some traditional movie houses in Southeast Georgia, Southwest Georgia, coastal Georgia, the Central Savannah River Area, Central Georgia, Northeast Alabama, North Alabama, Northwest Alabama, Southeast Alabama and Northern Indiana. As a result the film was promoted more in those media markets and more widely distributed there.

Home media
The film was first released on VHS tape in the U.S. by Englewood Video, as part of their "Science Fiction Gold" series.  Times Forgotten later released the film on DVD.

References

Bibliography
 Warren, Bill. Keep Watching the Skies: American Science Fiction Films of the Fifties: 21st Century Edition. Jefferson, North Carolina: McFarland & Company, 2009 (first edition: Volume 1 (1982), Volume 2 (1986)). .

External links

 
In-depth review of the film
 The Strange World of Planet X at Moria - Science Fiction, Horror and Fantasy Film Review

1958 films
1950s science fiction horror films
British black-and-white films
British science fiction horror films
Films based on science fiction novels
Giant monster films
Mad scientist films
Films based on British novels
Films shot at British National Studios
1950s English-language films
Films directed by Gilbert Gunn
1950s British films